The  is an electric multiple unit (EMU) train type operated by the private railway operator Shin-Keisei Electric Railway on the Shin-Keisei Line in Chiba Prefecture, Japan from 1978 to 2021.

Formations
, the fleet consists of three six-car sets based at Kunugiyama Depot with four motored (M) intermediate cars and two driving trailer (Tc) cars, formed as shown below, with the odd-numbered Tc car at the Tsudanuma end.

 The M2 cars are each fitted with two lozenge-type pantographs.
 The middle M1 car is designated as having mild air-conditioning.

History
The first set was introduced on 1 December 1978. Eight more sets were introduced between 1979 and 1985. With the introduction of newer trains, scrapping and retirements began in 2011. The last set, 8512, was retired on 1 November 2021, following an announcement on the company's official Twitter account.

Livery variations
Trainsets introduced from 1979 onward carried what subsequently became known as the Shin-Keisei "standard livery", consisting of beige with a brown stripe below the windows. This livery was also used on the 8800 series trains introduced in 1986. From December 2006, the trains were repainted into a modified version of this livery with the brown stripes replaced by maroon stripes, coinciding with the start of through-running to and from the Keisei Chiba Line.

The first set to receive Shin-Keisei's new pink and white corporate livery introduced in 2014 was 8518 in April 2017.

In 2017, one of the last three 8000 series sets remaining in service, 8512, was specially repainted into the standard livery introduced in 1979.

References

External links

 Official Shin-Keisei rolling stock information 

Electric multiple units of Japan
Train-related introductions in 1978
Nippon Sharyo multiple units
1500 V DC multiple units of Japan